The Hamilton-Wentworth Catholic District School Board (HWCDSB) is the Catholic school board for the city of Hamilton, which includes the former Wentworth County. It currently operates 49 elementary schools and 7 secondary schools, along with one continuing education school.

History 
The Hamilton Separate School Board (HSSB) was established in 1855 and the seven other boards were formed for the next 114 years in Wentworth County. In 1969, the boards became known as the Hamilton-Wentworth Roman Catholic Separate School Board (HWRCSSB).

Following the Ontario government's passage of the Fewer School Boards Act of 1997, the HWRCSSB became the English-language Separate District School Board No. 47 in 1998 and was renamed to the Hamilton-Wentworth Catholic District School Board (HWCDSB) in 1999. French language schools operated by its francophone unit, the Le conseil des écoles séparées catholiques romaines de Hamilton-Wentworth became part of French-language Separate District School Board No. 58, which later became the Conseil scolaire de district catholique Centre-Sud.

The school board currently operates 57 schools.

Schools

Continuing Education Centre 

 St. Charles Adult and Continuing Education Centre

Secondary schools 

 Bishop Ryan
 Bishop Tonnos
 Cathedral
 St. Jean de Brébeuf
 St. John Henry Newman
 St. Mary
 St. Thomas More

Elementary schools 

 Annunciation of Our Lord
 Blessed Sacrament
 Canadian Martyrs
 Corpus Christi
 Guardian Angels
 Holy Name of Jesus
 Holy Name of Mary
 Immaculate Conception
 Immaculate Heart of Mary
 Our Lady of Hope
 Our Lady of Lourdes
 Our Lady of Mount Carmel
 Our Lady of Peace
 Our Lady of the Assumption
 Regina Mundi
 Sacred Heart of Jesus
 St. Agnes
 St. Ann (Ancaster)
 St. Ann (Hamilton)
 St. Anthony Daniel
 St. Augustine
 St. Bernadette
 St. Clare of Assisi
 St. David
 St. Eugene
 St. Francis Xavier
 St. Gabriel
 St. James the Apostle
 St. Joachim
 St. John Paul II
 St. John the Baptist
 St. Joseph
 St. Kateri Tekakwitha
 St. Lawrence
 St. Luke
 St. Margaret Mary
 St. Marguerite d'Youville
 St. Mark
 St. Martin of Tours
 St. Matthew
 St. Michael
 St. Patrick
 St. Paul
 St. Teresa of Avila
 St. Teresa of Calcutta
 St. Thérèse of Lisieux
 St. Thomas the Apostle
 St. Vincent de Paul
 Sts. Peter and Paul

The following schools in the school board offer French immersion:
 St. Clare of Assisi Catholic Elementary School
 St. Vincent de Paul Catholic Elementary School
 St. Joseph Catholic Elementary School
 St. Eugene Catholic Elementary School
 Sts. Peter & Paul Catholic Elementary School

Trustees 
The HWCDSB consists of 9 trustees elected from wards across the City of Hamilton. These wards either match or are the combination of multiple municipal wards for council elections. Trustees are elected for a four-year term during each municipal election. The last election for trustees was held on October 22, 2018. The next election for trustees will be held on October 24, 2022.

Catholic school trustees are expected to advance the goal of Catholic education, participate in their parish, and "provide support, encouragement and prayer for the efforts of all persons engaged  in the ministry of Catholic Education", in accordance with the HWCDSB's Trustee Code of Conduct.

See also 
 Hamilton-Wentworth District School Board
 List of High Schools in Hamilton
 List of school districts in Ontario
 List of secondary schools in Ontario

References

External links 
 
 
 

Education in Hamilton, Ontario
Roman Catholic school districts in Ontario